Yauheni Karmilchyk is a Belarusian boxer. He participated at the 2021 AIBA World Boxing Championships, being awarded the bronze medal in the minimumweight event.

References

External links 

Living people
Place of birth missing (living people)
Year of birth missing (living people)
Belarusian male boxers
Mini-flyweight boxers
AIBA World Boxing Championships medalists
21st-century Belarusian people